The Best of Herman's Hermits: The 50th Anniversary Anthology is a 2-CD set by British group Herman's Hermits, released in 2015 on Bear Family Records. The set was produced and compiled by Grammy-nominated producer Ron Furmanek and includes the band's greatest hits along with demos, stereo mixes and session outtakes.

Reception

In Stephen Thomas Erlewine's review of the album for AllMusic, he believes the anthology is "a little light, particularly on the earliest recordings" but that this two-disc set is smartly assembled, so it gains momentum as it proceeds headlong through its 66 tracks." Although not sequenced chronologically, Erlewine says that is a benefit because it ends giving emphasis to both the early and later parts of the band's career on each disc. "Like no other compilation in their catalog, [it] makes a convincing case for the quintet as pleasing purveyors of pure pop".

Track listing

Disc 1
"Only Last Night" (Demo) (Silverman*, Lisberg) - 2:18
"I'm into Something Good" (Carole King - Gerry Goffin) - 2:39
"Mrs. Brown, You've Got a Lovely Daughter" (Trevor Peacock)  Arranged By – John Paul Jones - 2:56
"Kansas City Loving" (Leiber - Stoller) - 2:05
"Sea Cruise" (Huey Smith) - 2:08
"Walkin' with My Angel" (Gerry Goffin - Carole King) - 2:20
"Show Me Girl" (Gerry Goffin - Carole King) - 2:34
"I Understand (Just How You Feel)" (Pat Best) - 3:03
"Mother-in-Law" (Alan Toussaint) - 2:31
"Your Hand in Mine" (Charlie Silverman, Harvey Lisberg) - 2:03
"Thinkin' of You" (Pearson, John Wright [Uncredited]) - 2:04
"Wonderful World" (Campbell, H. Alpert*, L. Adler, S. Cooke) - 1:58
"Just a Little Bit Better" (Kenny Young) - 2:53
"Hold On! (Single Version)" (Phil Sloan, Steve Barri) - 2:00
"Leaning on the Lamp Post (Single Version)" (Noel Gay) - 2:43
"A Must to Avoid" (Phil Sloan, Steve Barri) - 1:59
"My Reservation's Been Confirmed" (Silverman, D. Leckenby, K. Hopwood) - 2:52
"The Story of My Life" (Burt Bacharach - Hal David) - 2:29
"There's a Kind of Hush" (Geoff Stephens, Les Reed) - 2:33
"Saturday's Child" (Gates) - 2:40
"If You're Thinkin' What I'm Thinkin'" (Boyce - Hart) - 2:24
"You Won't Be Leaving" (Tony Hazzard) - 2:39
"Dandy" (Ray Davies) - 2:29
"Jezebel" (Charles Aznavour, Wayne Shanklin) - 3:21
"No Milk Today" (Graham Gouldman) - 3:29
"Little Miss Sorrow, Child of Tomorrow" (B. Woodley) - 2:34
"Gaslite Street" (Derek Leckenby, Keith Hopwood) - 2:38
"Rattler" (Bruce Woodley) - 3:13
"East West" (Graham Gouldman) - 2:08
"What Is Wrong - What Is Right" (Leckenby, Harvey Lisberg, Hopwood) - 2:32
"Mum & Dad" (Peter Callender - Mitch Murray) - 2:14
"My Sentimental Friend" (Geoff Stephens, John Carter) - 3:53
"Years May Come, Years May Go" (Pop, Jack Fishman) - 3:42

Disc 2
"Thinkin' of You" (Demo) (Pearson, Wright [Uncredited]) - 2:05
"Can't You Hear My Heartbeat" (Ken Lewis - John Carter) - 2:16
"I'm Henry VIII, I Am" (Murray, Weston) - 1:49
"The End of the World" (Arthur Kent, Sylvia Dee) - 2:58
"For Your Love" (Graham Gouldman) - 2:25
"I Gotta Dream On" (G. Gordon) - 2:13
"Don't Try to Hurt Me" (Keith Hopwood) - 2:05
"Silhouettes" (Bob Crewe, Frank Slay) - 2:19
"I'll Never Dance Again" (Mann, Anthony) - 3:28
"Tell Me Baby" (Leckenby, Keith Hopwood) - 2:14
"Listen People (Single Version)" (Graham Gouldman) - 2:29
"Bus Stop" (Graham Gouldman) - 2:29
"Little Boy Sad" (Wayne Walker) - 2:24
"This Door Swings Both Ways" (Don Thomas, Estelle Levitt) - 2:06
"Museum" (Donovan Leitch) - 2:51
"Upstairs Downstairs" (Graham Gouldman) - 2:08
"Busy Line" (Leckenby, Lisberg, Green, Hopwood) - 2:28
"Moonshine Man" (Leckenby, Lisberg, Green, Hopwood) - 2:33
"Green Street Green" (Geoff Stephens) - 2:11
"Don't Go Out into the Rain (You're Going to Melt)" (Kenny Young) - 2:13
"I Call Out Her Name" (Leckenby, Hopwood) - 1:51
"The London Look" (Graham Gouldman) - 2:05
"The Colder It Gets" (L. Russell Brown [Uncredited], Raymond Bloodworth) - 2:26
"A Year Ago Today" (Stephens, Carter) - 2:42
"I Can Take or Leave Your Loving (Alternate Spoken Ending)" (Tony MacAuley - John MacLeod) - 2:40
"Sleepy Joe" (Carter*, Alquist) - 3:17
"Just One Girl" (Adrian Love, John Paul Jones) - 2:46
"Sunshine Girl" (Geoff Stephens, John Carter) - 2:36
"Something's Happening" (Bigazzi, Fishman, Delturco) - 3:16
"Here Comes the Star" (Johnny Young) - 3:32
"It's Alright Now" (David Most, Hillary, Peter Noone) - 2:41
"Smile Please" (A. King, D. Most, Peter Noone) - 2:41
"Bet Yer Life I Do" (Undubbed Mix) (Errol Brown, T. Wilson) - 2:47

Credits
Artwork – Mychael Gerstenberger
Engineer [Original] – Dave Siddle (tracks: 1-1 to 1-15, 1-17 to 1-32, 2-1 to 2-29), Dick Bogert (tracks: 1-16), Martin Birch (tracks: 1-33, 2-30 to 2-33)
Engineer [Remix] – Mike Jarratt
Mastered by Mark Mathews
Photography by [Picture Restoration] – Sam Malbuch
Producer [Original] – Mickie Most (tracks: 1-2 to 1-33, 2-2 to 2-33), Ron Richards (tracks: 1-1, 2-1)
Reissue producer, compiled by – Ron Furmanek
Remix – Ron Furmanek
Special audio help

Notes
All songs remixed from the original 2-, 3-, 4-, and 8-track master tapes.
All songs are first time stereo except tracks 1-16, 1-19, 1-31, 2-15 to 2-17, 2-19 and 2-20

Songwriting credit for track 2-23 listed as unknown
Songwriting credit for track 2-30 mistakingly given to Kenny Young and Mireille Noone
Songwriting credit for track 2-31 mistakingly given to Mickie Most

References

2015 compilation albums
Herman's Hermits albums